Scott Clifford Cairns (born 1954 in Tacoma, Washington) is an American poet, memoirist, librettist, and essayist.

Formal education 
Cairns earned a Bachelor of Arts degree from Western Washington University (1977), a Master of Arts degree from Hollins University (1979), a Master of Fine Arts degree from Bowling Green State University (1981), and a PhD from the University of Utah (1990).

Academic career 
Cairns has served on the faculties of Kansas State University, Westminster College, University of North Texas, Old Dominion University.  He recently retired as Curators' Distinguished Professor of English at the University of Missouri.  While at North Texas, Cairns had served as editor of the American Literary Review. He was founding director of Writing Workshops in Greece, an annual, 4-week workshop during the month of June, located on the island of Thasos. Since 2015, he has also served on the poetry faculty of the Seattle Pacific University low-residency MFA program in creative writing, and currently serves as that program's director. With Carolyn Forché and Ilya Kaminsky, he also directs Mystikós: A Writers Retreat in Greece.

Works 
Cairns is the author of ten collections of poetry, one collection of translations of Christian mystics, one spiritual memoir (now translated into Greek and Romanian), a book-length essay on suffering, and co-edited The Sacred Place with Scott Olsen, an anthology of poetry, fiction and nonfiction. It won the inaugural National Outdoor Book Award (Outdoor Literature category) in 1997. He wrote the libretto for "The Martyrdom of Saint Polycarp", an oratorio composed by JAC Redford, and the libretto for "A Melancholy Beauty", an oratorio composed by Georgi Andreev. Cairns's poems have appeared in journals including The Atlantic Monthly, The Paris Review, The New Republic, Image, and Poetry, and have been anthologized in Upholding Mystery (Oxford University Press, 1996), Best Spiritual Writing (Harper Collins, 1998 and 2000), and Best American Spiritual Writing (Houghton Mifflin, 2004, 2005, and 2006).

Family 
He is married to Marcia Lane Vanderlip and they have two children, Benjamin V. Cairns and Elizabeth V. Cairns-Callen. He has a brother, Steve Cairns, who currently resides in Hong Kong, teaching at an International School.

Awards 
2006 Guggenheim Fellow
2014 The Denise Levertov Award

Works
 Another Road Home, Poetry (July–August 2009)
 Eremite, Poetry (January 2009)
 Idiot Psalms, Poetry (January 2009)

External links
 Partaking in the Holy Mysteries Scott Cairns Interview Part I,
 Partaking in the Holy Mysteries Scott Cairns Interview Part II,
 Scott Cairns Interview/ Scott Cairns Interview
 Scott Cairns on Reading, Writing, and Responsibility
 Scott Cairns: Words Lead You To Ideas
 Scott Cairns
 Scott Cairns: A Poet's Dialogue
 Scott Cairns Findingod

References
Bibliography
 Anaphora (Paraclete Press, 2019) 
 Slow Pilgrim: The Collected Poems (Paraclete Press, 2015) 
 Idiot Psalms: New Poems (Paraclete Press, 2014) 
 Endless Life: Poems of the Mystics (Translations/Adaptations: Paraclete Press, 2014) 
 The End of Suffering: Finding Purpose in Pain (Nonfiction: Paraclete Press, 2009) 
 Love's Immensity: Mystics on the Endless Life (Translations/Adaptations: Paraclete Press, 2007) 
 Short Trip to the Edge: Where Earth Meets Heaven—A Pilgrimage, Spiritual Memoir: (HarperSanFrancisco]], 2007) 
 Compass of Affection: Poems New and Selected, Poems: Paraclete Press, 2006, 
 Philokalia (Poems: Zoo Press, 2002)
 Recovered Body Poems: George Braziller Inc., 1998 
 The Sacred Place [co-edited with Scott Olsen] (Anthology: University of Utah Press, 1996)
 Figures for the Ghost Poems: University of Georgia Press, 1994, 
 Disciplinary Treatises (Poetry Chapbook: Trilobite Press, 1993)
 Sermons for the Wary (Poetry Chapbook: Franciscan University Press, 1993)
 The Translation of Babel (Poems: University of Georgia Press, 1990)
 The Theology of Doubt (Poems: Cleveland State University Press, 1985)
 Finding the Broken Man (Poetry Chapbook: Window Press, 1982)

General references (biographical)

Inline citations

1954 births
Writers from Tacoma, Washington
Western Washington University alumni
Bowling Green State University alumni
University of Utah alumni
University of North Texas faculty
Hollins University alumni
American male poets
American poets
University of Missouri faculty
Living people
Chapbook writers